The State University of Surabaya or Surabaya State University (abbreviated as) is a public university located in Surabaya, a metropolitan city in northeastern coastal region of Java Island. It is one of the top universities in Indonesia and has been accredited internationally based on the Standards and Guidelines for Quality Assurance in the European Higher Education Area (ESG). It is the top 3 public universities in the capital of East Java, along with the Airlangga University and Sepuluh Nopember Institute of Technology.

History
UNESA was formerly known as The Institute of Teaching and Education Sciences of Surabaya (Indonesian: Institut Keguruan dan Ilmu Pendidikan Surabaya; abbreviated as IKIP Surabaya).
It started for graduating teachers, qualified for preschool, elementary, junior high, and senior high school. Now UNESA has seven faculties and one graduate school, 47 undergraduate programs, 12 diploma programs, and 15 postgraduate and doctorate programs. It has approximately 31,364 students and 834 lecturers (244 undergraduates, 470 postgraduates, 76 doctoral, and 27 professors).

In 1950, UNESA was founded from B-I and B-II courses majoring in Chemical Sciences and Exact Sciences to ensure the availability of junior and senior high school teachers.. It used classrooms and laboratories belonging to the Dutch Hogere burgerschool (HBS).  In 1957, these B-I courses were grouped into General B-I Courses and Special B-I Courses. The General B-I Courses included English and German languages, while the Special B-I Courses included Chemical Sciences, Exact Sciences, Economics, Technical, Sports, and Aeronautical Sciences.

In 1960, the B-I and B-II courses were integrated into Faculty of Education and Teacher Training (Indonesian: Fakultas Keguruan dan Ilmu Pendidikan or FKIP) to graduate advanced school teachers. In 1961, this was absorbed into FKIP Universitas Airlangga Cabang Malang and named FKIP Universitas Airlangga Cabang Surabaya. January 3, 1963, FKIP and the Institute of Teacher Training (founded in 1962) was merged with IKIP Malang Cabang Surabaya.

December 19, 1964, IKIP Surabaya was officially established with five faculties: Education, Social Teaching, Language Art Teaching, Exact Science Teaching, and Engineering Sciences Teaching. In 1977, the Faculty of Sports Science Teaching became the sixth. That year, five of the six faculties changed their names to the Faculty of Languages and Art, Faculty of Mathematics and Natural Sciences, Faculty of Social Sciences, Faculty of Engineering, and Faculty of Sport Sciences.

Through a Presidential Regulation dated August 4, 1999, IKIP Surabaya changed its name to Universitas Negeri Surabaya. In 2006, UNESA opened a new Faculty of Economics as a separate entity from its parent faculty, Social Sciences. In 2014, UNESA opened two departments, Communication Sciences under the Faculty of Social Sciences, and Islamic Economics under the Faculty of Economics.

UNESA has two main campuses in Ketintang and Lidah Wetan, a supporting campus for Department of Extraordinary Education in Gedangan, Sidoarjo, two language centers in Ketintang Campus and Dr. Moestopo, and laboratory schools for education-based programs, including a kindergarten, an elementary school and two middle schools. UNESA is known as an inclusive campus, which means disabled students can study along with the able-bodied students. It has a study and service center for disabled people, and provides assistance for disabled people in Surabaya, especially in the campus.

Campuses
The State University of Surabaya currently has two main campuses, namely the Ketintang Campus and Lidah Wetan Campus complexes.

Ketintang Campus
The Ketintang Campus historically served as the main campus of the university back in the 1950s to 1990s before it was split into two campuses. Currently, the Ketintang Campus has four faculties, such as the Faculty of Economics and Business, Faculty of Engineering, Faculty of Mathematics and Natural Sciences, as well as the Faculty of Social and Law Sciences.

Located in South Surabaya, the Ketintang Campus is relatively close to some public attractions such as the Royal Plaza, the Surabaya Zoo, the City of Tomorrow Mall, the Trans Snow World, the DBL Arena, the Al-Akbar National Mosque, the Bungurasih bus terminal/station, the Ciputra World Surabaya mall, etc.

Lidah Wetan Campus
The Lidah Wetan Campus complex, or colloquially also abbreviated as the Liwet Campus serves as the current main campus of the university and it is surrounded by another supporting 's facilitation complex, such as the university swimming pool area, Graha  (a designated convention hall for convocation or graduation), etc. Currently, it has three faculties such as the Faculty of Education, Faculty of Languages and Arts, as well as the Faculty of Sports Sciences.

Located in West Surabaya, the Lidah Wetan Campus is close to the entertaining and business center area, such as the Pakuwon Mall (the largest mall in Indonesia), the Consulate General of the United States (the ultimate U.S. consulate general in Indonesia), the Consulate of Czech Republic, the G-Walk culinary complex, the Lenmarc Mall, the Spazio Business Office Space, etc.

Faculties and departments

 Faculty of Economics and Business
 Department of Economics Education
 Department of Managements
 Department of Accounting
 Department of Islamic Economics

 Faculty of Education
 Department of Guidance and Counseling
 Department of Education Technology
 Department of Non-Formal Education
 Department of Special Education
 Department of Pre and Elementary school
 Department of Psychology
 Department of Early Childhood Teacher Training Education
 Department of Education Management

 Faculty of Languages and Arts
 Department of Indonesian Education
 Department of English Education
 Department of German Education
 Department of Japanese Education
 Department of Javanese Education
 Department of Mandarin Education
 Department of Drawing Art Education
 Department of Dancing Art Education
 Department of Indonesian literature
 Department of English literature
 Department of English Business
 Department of German literature

 Faculty of Mathematics and Natural Sciences
 Department of Mathematics Education
 Department of Physics Education
 Department of Chemistry Education
 Department of Biology Education
 Department of Sciences Education
 Department of Mathematics
 Department of Physics
 Department of Chemistry
 Department of Biology

 Faculty of Social and Law Sciences
 Department of Geography Education
 Department of History Education
 Department of Sociology
 Department of State Administration Science
 Department of Law Science
 Department of Communication Science 

 Faculty of Engineering
 Department of Electrical Engineering Education
 Department of Mechanical Engineering Education
 Department of Building Engineering Education
 Department of Family Welfare Education
 Department of Make up Education
 Department of Civil Engineering
 Department of Mechanical Engineering
 Department of Electrical Engineering

 Faculty of Sports Sciences
 Department of Sport Science
 Department of Health and Recreation Education
 Department of Sport Coaching Education

Partnerships
The State University of Surabaya has international partnerships worldwide, such as:
 Central China Normal University (China)
 Hat Yai University (Thailand)
 Islamic Science University (Malaysia)
 Kaichi International University (Japan)
 Khon Kaen University (Thailand)
 Kwame Nkrumah University of Science and Technology (Ghana)
 Prince of Songkla University (Thailand)
 Science University (Malaysia)
 Tun Hussein Onn University (Malaysia)
 Technology University of MARA (Malaysia)
 United States Agency for International Development (United States of America)
 University of Alicante (Spain)
 University of Kent (United Kingdom)
 Walailak University (Thailand)

Student life

Demographics
As a university located in international port city of Surabaya, the students of Surabaya State University are very diverse ethnically and culturally, it may include all ethnic groups of Indonesian origin as well as international (non-native Indonesians) origin background, with Javanese being the largest ethnic in the university.

Languages
As Surabaya is the native homeland of Javanese, the spoken language in the university tend to be more dominated by the speakers of Surabaya Javanese (a dialect of Javanese uniquely native to Surabaya). Known for its multilingualism, Indonesians (which in this case also including the students of Surabaya State University) are also able to communicate in Indonesian (the national language of Indonesia), English (as an international intermediate language), and another ethnic languages. However, in classes, the spoken languages are heavily emphasized on Indonesian (Standard Indonesian) and English (Standard English), but in International Class programs specifically, English used as the main spoken language.

Besides English, another (non-native) languages are also spoken by the students in respective faculties and departments (especially in the Faculty of Languages and Arts), such as German (Standard German), Japanese (Standard Japanese), Chinese (Mandarin/Standard Chinese), etc.

References

External links
 Official website of Surabaya State University

Universities in Indonesia
Universities in East Java
Educational institutions in Surabaya
Indonesian state universities